Vasile Alecsandri National Theatre may refer to:

 Iași National Theatre, founded in 1840, is the oldest national theatre and one of the most prestigious theatrical institutions in Romania
 Bălți National Theatre, which became in 1990 the first national theatre in Moldova